The 1974 California Angels season involved the Angels finishing sixth in the American League West with a record of 68 wins and 94 losses. This was the Angels' first last place divisional finish in franchise history.

Offseason 
 October 22, 1973: Clyde Wright, Steve Barber, Ken Berry, Art Kusnyer, and cash were traded by the Angels to the Milwaukee Brewers for Ellie Rodríguez, Ollie Brown, Joe Lahoud, Skip Lockwood, and Gary Ryerson.
 December 6, 1973: Aurelio Monteagudo and Chris Coletta were sent by the Angels to the Philadelphia Phillies for Denny Doyle to complete an earlier deal (the Angels sent Billy Grabarkewitz and players to be named later to the Phillies for a player to be named later) made on August 14, 1973.

Regular season 
On August 25, Nolan Ryan struck out Sandy Alomar for the 1,500th strikeout of his career. Ryan and Alomar had been teammates earlier in the season before Alomar was sold to the Yankees on July 8.

Season standings

Record vs. opponents

Notable transactions 
 April 30, 1974: Richie Scheinblum was traded by the Angels to the Kansas City Royals for Paul Schaal.
 May 4, 1974: Mike Epstein was released by the Angels.
 June 5, 1974: Greg Harris was drafted by the Angels in the 10th round of the 1974 Major League Baseball draft, but did not sign.
 June 15, 1974: Rudy May was purchased from the Angels by the New York Yankees.
 July 8, 1974: Sandy Alomar Sr. was purchased from the Angels by the New York Yankees.
 July 28, 1974: Rick Stelmaszek was traded by the Angels to the Chicago Cubs for Horacio Piña.
 September 12, 1974: Frank Robinson was traded by the Angels to the Cleveland Indians for Ken Suarez, Rusty Torres, and cash.

Roster

Player stats

Batting

Starters by position 
Note: Pos = Position; G = Games played; AB = At bats; H = Hits; Avg. = Batting average; HR = Home runs; RBI = Runs batted in

Other batters 
Note: G = Games played; AB = At bats; H = Hits; Avg. = Batting average; HR = Home runs; RBI = Runs batted in

Pitching

Starting pitchers 
Note: G = Games pitched; IP = Innings pitched; W = Wins; L = Losses; ERA = Earned run average; SO = Strikeouts

Other pitchers 
Note: G = Games pitched; IP = Innings pitched; W = Wins; L = Losses; ERA = Earned run average; SO = Strikeouts

Relief pitchers 
Note: G = Games pitched; W = Wins; L = Losses; SV = Saves; ERA = Earned run average; SO = Strikeouts

Farm system 

LEAGUE CHAMPIONS: Idaho Falls

Notes

References 

1974 California Angels team at Baseball-Reference
1974 California Angels team page at www.baseball-almanac.com

Los Angeles Angels seasons
California Angels season
Los